Hits is a compilation album by Mike + The Mechanics, released in 1996 except in the United States and Canada, where it was released in 2005. It contains nearly all of the band's hits up to the time of its release. "All I Need Is a Miracle" was re-recorded for the album.

Reception

Peter Kane in Q wrote, "These are all songs that are uniformly high on melody and craftsmanship, with mercifully no hidden agenda." In a retrospective review, AllMusic editor Stephen Thomas Erlewine declared Hits "a first-rate compilation, giving the casual fan all of the essential Mike + the Mechanics tracks".

Track listing
"All I Need Is a Miracle '96"
"Over My Shoulder"
"Word of Mouth"
"The Living Years"
"Another Cup of Coffee"
"Nobody's Perfect"
"Silent Running (On Dangerous Ground)"
"Nobody Knows"
"Get Up"
"A Time and Place"
"Taken In"
"Everybody Gets a Second Chance"
"A Beggar on a Beach of Gold"

Tracks 1*, 7, and 11 are taken from Mike + The Mechanics (1985)
Tracks 4, 6, and 8 are taken from Living Years (1988)
Tracks 3, 9, 10, and 12 are taken from Word of Mouth (1991)
Tracks 2, 5, and 13 are taken from Beggar on a Beach of Gold (1995)
 *Re-recording of original album track.

References

1996 greatest hits albums
Mike + The Mechanics albums
Albums produced by Mike Rutherford
Albums produced by Christopher Neil